The following is a list of Serbian basketball players that play or have played in the Women's National Basketball Association (WNBA).

Active players
The following is a list of current WNBA players.
Note: This list is correct through the end of the  season.

Former players
The following is a list of former WNBA players.

Drafted players
The following is a list of drafted players who have never appeared in an WNBA regular season or playoff game.

Players with Serbian citizenship or parentage
The following is a list of players, that play or have played in the WNBA, who have citizenship of Serbia or Serbian parentage or who are Serbs of former Yugoslav republics (Bosnia and Herzegovina, Croatia, Montenegro, North Macedonia, Slovenia).

See also
 List of foreign WNBA players
 List of Serbian NBA players
 List of Serbian NBA coaches

Notes
Details

Other nationalities, ethnic groups, native-language

References

Women's National Basketball Association players from Serbia
basketball
Serbian expatriate basketball people in the United States
Serbia
WNBA players